Força Verde is the fifth solo album by Brazilian singer/guitarist Zé Ramalho. It was released in 1982.

Ramalho was accused of plagiarism for the opening and title track: its lyrics are a translation of a poem by Irish writer William Butler Yeats but Ramalho apparently copied it from an Incredible Hulk magazine, without knowing or citing the origin of it. It resulted in a lawsuit, and the writer was cited on subsequent albums.

"Beira-Mar – Capítulo II" is the continuation of a trilogy started on "Beira-Mar" (from 1979's A Peleja do Diabo com o Dono do Céu) and finished on "Beira-Mar – Capítulo Final" (from 1998's Eu Sou Todos Nós).

Track listing 
"Força Verde" (Green Force) – 5:31
"Eternas Ondas" (Eternal Waves) – 5:01
"O Monte Olímpia" (The Mount Olímpia) – 3:45
"Banquete de Signos" (Signs' Banquet) – 6:06
"Visões de Zé Limeira Sobre o Final do Século XX" (Visions of Zé Limeira of the End of the 20th Century) – 3:36
"Pepitas de Fogo" (Fire gold nuggets) – 5:14
"Beira-Mar – Capítulo II" (Near the Sea – Chapter II) – 5:44
"Os Segredos de Sumé" (The Secrets of Sumé) – 3:49
"Amálgama" (Amalgam) – 4:09
"Cristais do Tempo" (Crystals of the Time) – 2:17

2003 Re-Issue 
"Morceguinho (O Rei da Natureza)" (Little Bat (The King of Nature)) – 2:17
"São Sebastião do Rodeio" (Saint Sebastian of the Rodeio) – 3:40 
"Frevo Mulher" (Woman Frevo) – 3:38
"Rapaz do táxi"  (Taxi Guy) – 3:37

All music by Zé Ramalho.

References

1982 albums
Zé Ramalho albums
Epic Records albums
Albums involved in plagiarism controversies